Primah Kwagala is a Ugandan civil and human rights lawyer and CEO of the Women’s Probono Initiative (WPI) in Uganda. She has handled cases involving illegal detentions in health facilities, access to emergency obstetric care and to free vital medicines, and more. She is the Chairperson of Female Lawyers in the Uganda Law Society. Kwagala was awarded the 2020 Peace and Reconciliation Prize that was handed over to by H.E Albrecht Conze, the German Ambassador in Uganda, H.E Jules-Armand ANIAMBOSSOU who is the Ambassador of France to Uganda and Henry Oryem Okello the State Minister for Foreign Affairs at the 57th Anniversary celebrations of Elysee Treaty . On Women's Day in the year, 2022, she was named by the U. S Embassy in Uganda as one of Uganda's Outstanding women of Courage and she was awarded with EU Human Right Defenders Award 2022.

Career 
Kwagala was program manager of strategic litigation, policy and advocacy manager for the Center for Health, Human Rights, and Development. In 2014 and 2018, Kwagala was honored as an outstanding Health and Human Rights Lawyer. In 2012, she was  the Advocacy Fellow at the Institute for the Study of Human Rights at Columbia University. Between 2012-2014, she led CEHUR's advocacy program that advocated for legal reform in laws and policies on health in Uganda and the East African region. In 2018, Kwagala was nominated and chosen be a 2018 New Voice Fellow by the Aspen Institute.

Achievements 
Through her organization, Kwagala has returned several Ugandan women trafficked in the Middle East. She also uncovered the abuse of children by Renee Bach, an American volunteer who left her home in Virginia to set up a charity to help children in Jinja.

References

External links 

 Women’s Probono Initiative (WPI)

Ugandan human rights activists
Living people
Ugandan women activists
21st-century Ugandan lawyers
Ugandan women lawyers
Year of birth missing (living people)